Ralph Endersby (born 26 June 1950) is a Canadian actor and producer. He began his acting career in his youth, seen internationally on the 1960s television series The Forest Rangers.

Endersby was one of many CBC television vets to appear in Jim Henson's 1969 experimental drama The Cube, as the guitarist whose band practice unnerves the protagonist. A portion of the guitarist's song lyrics were later quoted in the book It's Not Easy Being Green.

Endersby's other acting credits included roles in a few 70s Canadian features, including Homer, Rip-Off (with Hugh Webster), and Vengeance Is Mine (with Michael J. Pollard, Louis Zorich, Eric Clavering, and Carl Banas). In recent years, Endersby has switched to writing and directing, and also produced the TV movie The Challengers.

Filmography 
 1963-1966: The Forest Rangers, as Junior Ranger Leader Chub Stanley (TV series)
 1969: My Side of the Mountain (film)
 1969: The Cube
 1970: Homer (film)
 1970-1971: Adventures in Rainbow Country (guest appearance, TV series)
 1971: Rip-Off (film)
 1974: Vengeance is Mine (film)
 1976: For the Record: A Nest of Shadows (TV film)
 1990: The Challengers (producer, CBC TV movie)

External links 
 Ralph Endersby profile on Northern Stars

1950 births
Living people
Canadian male film actors
Canadian male television actors
Film producers from Ontario